INS Dolphin may refer to one of the following submarines of the Israeli Sea Corps:

 , the former  HMS Truncheon (P353); acquired by the Israeli Sea Corps in 1965; scrapped in 1977

Israeli Navy ship names